Toujours un ailleurs (meaning Always Elsewhere) is the sixth international studio album by Anggun. It was released physically in France and Belgium by TF1 Musique on 20 November 2015, and as a digital album worldwide. It became her first French-language album not to have its standalone English-language version. The album revisited the world music direction of her debut international album, Snow on the Sahara (1997). Toujours un ailleurs was produced by Frédéric Chateau and Brian Rawling, and features guest vocals by singers Florent Pagny, Yuri Buenaventura, and Angélique Kidjo.

Three singles—"À nos enfants", "Nos vies parallèles" (duet with Florent Pagny and featuring Yuri Buenaventura) and "Face au vent"—were released to promote the album. "Nos vies parallèles" became Anggun's longest-running single on the official SNEP Singles Chart, spending 27 weeks there with a peak position of number 47. It also became her first top 40 hit on the main Belgian Ultratop Singles Chart since 2005 single "Être une femme", peaking at number 39. In 2019, the remix version of "Perfect World" peaked at number 5 on the Billboard Hot Dance Club Song.

Background and development
Following the release of her fifth international studio album Echoes and her participation in the Eurovision Song Contest 2012, Anggun ventured into television by joining judging panel of several talent shows in Asia. She started writing songs for her next album after completing the first season of X Factor Indonesia (2013). On 14 February 2014 through her official Twitter account, Anggun posted a photo of her recording session in Metrophonic Studios, London, England, with Paul Barry, Patrick Mascall and James Jeffery. On her YouTube channel, Anggun later uploaded a 20-second snippet of the song "Perfect World" produced by Brian Rawling at Metrophonic Studios. Rawling is a Grammy Award-winning British producer who had produced albums of popular artists such as Cher, Tina Turner, Enrique Iglesias and One Direction. On 25 April 2014, Anggun posted a photo of her studio session with Deep Forest, who previously collaborated with her on "Deep Blue Sea" (2002).

While appearing on the TV show Les Années Bonheur, Anggun performed a cover version of Maxime Le Forestier's "Née quelque part", which would be included on her upcoming album. She announced that the album would be released circa March or April 2015. However, due to her involvement on Asia's Got Talent, the project was postponed to October 2015 and later to November 2015. In June 2015, Anggun told The Jakarta Post that she had already finished the French album with 12 tracks and in process to complete the English album by remaking six songs. Anggun announced that the French album is titiled Toujours un ailleurs. The album was distributed by TF1 Musique under Universal Music Group. The yet-untitled English version will be released by the end of 2016.

Tour
Anggun embarked on a concert tour to promote the album in 26 cities across France and Belgium.

Reception
According to the Syndicat National de l'Édition Phonographique (SNEP), Toujours un ailleurs was the 33rd best-selling digital album and the 38th best-selling physical album in France during its opening week. It debuted at number 43 on the combined French Albums Chart and remained on the chart for 24 weeks. It was certified gold by the SNEP for 50,000 copies shipped, becoming Anggun's most successful album in France since Luminescence (2005). Toujours un ailleurs also became her best-charting album in Belgium, charting for a total of 31 weeks with a peak of number 43. Outside of French-speaking countries, Toujours un ailleurs was only available via iTunes Store and made onto the iTunes Albums charts in Indonesia (top 10), Portugal (top 20), Mauritius, Singapore and Sri Lanka.

Track listing

Charts

Weekly charts

Year-end charts

Certifications

Release history

References

External links
 Anggun official website

2015 albums
Anggun albums
French-language albums
Albums produced by Brian Rawling